The 2023 TC2000 Championship will be the 45th season of Turismo Competición 2000, the premier touring car category of Argentina.

Calendar

Teams and drivers

Results and standings

Results summary

Championship standings
Drivers' championship

References

External links
Series website

TC2000
TC2000
TC2000